Te Popo is a settlement in inland Taranaki, in the western North Island of New Zealand. It is located ten kilometres northeast of Stratford.

Further reading

Business history

See  This company merged with the Midhirst co-operative in 1935.

People

Stratford District, New Zealand
Populated places in Taranaki